Burton Albion Football Club are a professional football club from Burton Upon Trent, Staffordshire. They were formed in 1950. They turned professional in 1950. In early 1950 they were elected into the Birmingham & District League where they remained until the end of the 1957-58 season. In the 1958-59 they moved into the Southern League. Before the 1979-80 they joined the Northern Premier League and in the 1987-88 they re-joined the Southern League. For the 2000-01 season they joined they re-joined the Northern Premier League then they joined the Football Conference and in the 2008-09 season they earned promotion to the Football League Two.

Honours and achievements
Football League One (Level 3)
Runners-Up: 2015-16
Football League Two (Level 4)
Winners (1): 2014-15
Football Conference (Level 5)
Winners (1): 2008-09
Northern Premier League (Level 6)
Winners (1): 2001-02
Southern League Premier Division (Level 6)
Runners-Up (2): 1999-2000, 2000–01
FA Trophy
Runners-Up (1): 1986-87
Southern League Cup
Winners (3): 1963-64, 1996–97, 1999–2000
Runners-Up (1): 1988-89
Northern Premier League Challenge Cup
Winners (1): 1982-83
Runners-Up (1): 1986-87
Northern League President's Cup
Runners-Up (2): 1982-83, 1985–86
Staffordshire Senior Cup
Winners (1): 1955-56
Runners-Up (1): 1976-77
Birmingham Senior Cup
Winners (2): 1953-54, 1996–97
Runners-Up (4): 1969-70, 1970–71, 1986–87, 2007–08
Bass Charity Vase
Winners (15): 1954, 1961, 1970, 1971, 1981, 1986, 1997, 2006, 2007, 2008, 2009, 2011, 2013, 2014, 2016
Runners-Up (12): 1952, 1957, 1973, 1980, 1982, 1983, 1984, 2002, 2003, 2004, 2005, 2010

Player records

Appearances

Goalscorers

Top Goalscorers

Managerial Records
First Manager: Reg Weston managed club for 338 games, from June 1950 to July 1957
Longest serving Manager: Nigel Clough managed club for 742 games, from October 1998 to January 2009 and since December 2015. At total of 11 years.

Club Records

Matches
First Football League match: Shrewsbury Town 3–1 Burton Albion, 8 August 2009
First League Cup match: Reading 5–1 Burton Albion, 11 August 2009
First Football League Trophy match: Burton Albion 1–5 Chesterfield, 1 September 2009
First match at Pirelli Stadium: Burton Albion 2–2 Chester City, 16 July 2005

Record wins
Record win: 12–1 v Coalville Town, Birmingham Senior Cup, 6 September 1954
Record Football League win: 6–1 v Aldershot Town, Football League Two, 12 December 2009
Record FA Cup win:
5–1 v Rothwell Town, 1983
4–0 v Wootton Blue Cross, 1984
5–1 v Letchwood Garden City, 1986
Record League Cup win: 4–2 v Leicester City, 28 August 2012

Record defeats
Record defeat: 0–10 v Barnet, Southern League Premier Division, 7 February 1970
Record Football League defeat:
1–7 v Bristol Rovers, Football League Two, 14 April 2012
1–7 v Port Vale, Football League Two, 5 April 2012
Record FA Cup:
0–7 v Charlton Athletic, 1952
Record League Cup:
0–9 v Manchester City, 9 January 2019

References

Records And Statistics
Burton Albion